Nanchang International School (NCIS) is an international primary school in Nanchang, Jiangxi Province, People's Republic of China.

Nanchang International School was established in August 2010 and is the first English-speaking international school in Jiangxi Province to be approved as an international school by the Chinese Ministry of Education. Matthew Bristow was the Founding Principal.

The school follows an inquiry-based curriculum and is authorized to teach the International Baccalaureate Primary Years Programme (PYP).

Facilities 

The school has a library, science room, sports hall, sports field, basketball courts, food technology room, ICT room, multi-purpose drama/music room, a gym, staff room, conference room, dining room and Mandarin room.

References

External links 

 Nanchang International School
 Nanchang International School 

Nanchang
International schools in China
International Baccalaureate schools in China
Education in Jiangxi
Educational institutions established in 2010
2010 establishments in China